Ainias Smith (born May 31, 2001) is an American football running back and wide receiver for the Texas A&M Aggies.

Early life and high school
Smith grew up in Missouri City, Texas and attended John Foster Dulles High School in Sugar Land, Texas. As a senior, he rushed for 481 yards and 10 touchdowns and caught 55 passes for 717 yards and 10 touchdowns. Smith committed to play college football at Texas A&M over Duke.

College career
As a freshman, Smith played mostly wide receiver and served as the team's primary return specialist and had 22 receptions for 248 yards and three touchdowns. He played running back in the 2019 Texas Bowl and rushed for 54 yards on seven carries in a 24-21 win over Oklahoma State. Smith was moved to running back before the start of his sophomore season. He finished the season with 293 yards and four touchdowns on 49 carries and also caught 43 passes for a team-leading 564 receiving yards with six touchdown receptions. Smith was named to the watchlist for the Hornung Award going into his junior season.

Personal life
Smith is the younger brother of NFL defensive back Maurice Smith. On July 20, 2022, Smith was arrested into Brazos County, Texas on three charges: unlawful carrying of a weapon, driving while intoxicated, and possession of marijuana.

References

External links
Texas A&M Aggies bio

Living people
American football running backs
American football wide receivers
Texas A&M Aggies football players
Players of American football from Texas
2001 births